Bernadette Randall (born 27 September 1965) is a retired tennis player from Australia.

She won the US Girls Doubles with American Ann Hulbert in 1983

Junior Grand Slam finals

Girls' doubles: 3 (2–1)

Career finals

Singles (2–0)

Doubles (4–0)

References

External links
 
 

Australian female tennis players
Grand Slam (tennis) champions in girls' doubles
1965 births
Living people
Tennis people from New South Wales
US Open (tennis) junior champions
Australian Open (tennis) junior champions
20th-century Australian women